The 1902 Idaho gubernatorial election was held on November 4, 1902. Republican nominee John T. Morrison defeated Democratic incumbent Frank W. Hunt with 52.90% of the vote.

General election

Candidates
Major party candidates
John T. Morrison, Republican 
Frank W. Hunt, Democratic

Other candidates
August M. Slatey, Socialist
Albert E. Gipson, Prohibition
DeForest Andrews, People's

Results

References

1902
Idaho
Gubernatorial